The 2007–08 Primera Divisió season was the 13th since its establishment in 1995. The first matches of the season were played on 23 September 2007. FC Rànger's are the defending champions, having won their 2nd title the previous season.

First round

Second round

Championship Round

Relegation Round

External links
 Primera Divisió on Soccerway website
 Primera Divisió on FedAndFut website

Primera Divisió seasons
Andorra
1